Ultracide is a song by Diatribe, released as a single in 1996 by Re-Constriction Records.

Music
The songs "Ultracide" and "Advanced Therapy" were previously unreleased before appearing on the Ultracide single while the original version of "Junkyard" was taken from the band's self-titled debut. In 1997 "Ultracide" was placed on Got Moose? Re-Constriction CD Sampler #2 by Re-Constriction Records while "Junkyard" (Radio Edit) was released on Awake the Machines - On the Line Vol. 2 by Out of Line and Sub/Mission Records.

Reception
Fabryka Music Magazine gave Ultracide three out of four possible stars and said ""Advanced Therapy" reminds me a bit of MLWTTKK, and "Ultracide" is a typical for Diatribe song with a variety of samples and stable atmosphere." Randolph Heard of Option recommended the release to those who enjoyed their 1996 debut album

Track listing

Personnel
Adapted from the Ultracide liner notes.

Diatribe
 Phil Biagini – electric guitar
 Marc Jameson – lead vocals, keyboards, drums, programming, production, engineering
 Kevin Marburg – bass guitar, sampler, cover art, design
 Pat Toves – electric guitar

Additional performers
 Eric Anest (as Statik) – editing and remixer (3)

Release history

References

External links 
 Ultracide/Junkyard at Discogs (list of releases)

1996 singles
1996 songs
Re-Constriction Records singles